Kaushambi Bhatt (born 1 October 1991) is an Indian actress from Gujarat, India. She is known for her role in Gujarati films Hellaro (2019), Dhunki (2019) and Montu Ni Bittu (2019).

Biography
Kaushambi Bhatt was born on 1 October 1991 in Rajkot, Gujarat. She received her school education in Rajkot, and college education at GLS College, Ahmedabad. She completed her master's degree in development communication from Gujarat University, Ahmedabad.

She debuted in 2019 Gujarati period drama film Hellaro, which won the National Film Award for Best Feature Film at the 66th National Film Awards and she earned Special Jury Award for her performance. The film has been theatrically released in India on 8 November 2019 to positive reviews and her acting is appreciated by the audiences. She later acted in Vijaygiri Bava's romantic comedy Montu Ni Bittu, and in Anish Shah's Dhunki.

She is also known for her role in the Gujarati play Kaalu Etle Andhaaru.

Awards and Accolades

Filmography

References

External links
 

1991 births
Special Jury Award (feature film) National Film Award winners
Living people
Gujarati people
Actresses in Gujarati cinema
People from Rajkot